James L. Ritz  (1874–1896) was a third baseman in Major League Baseball. He played in one game for the Pittsburgh Pirates of the National League on July 20, 1894. After his brief stint with the Pirates, he played for the Toledo White Stockings of the Western League in 1894, the Nashville Seraphs of the Southern Association in 1895 and the Washington Little Senators of the Interstate League in 1896.

See also
 List of baseball players who died during their careers

Sources

1874 births
1896 deaths
Baseball players from Pennsylvania
19th-century baseball players
Major League Baseball third basemen
Pittsburgh Pirates players
Toledo White Stockings players
Nashville Seraphs players
Washington Little Senators players